Võ Nguyễn Hoài Linh  (born December 18, 1969), better known by his stage name Hoài Linh, is a Vietnamese American comedian and actor. A frequent collaborator of Thúy Nga center, he is known for his comedy performances alongside other artists such as Vân Sơn and Chí Tài.

Biography
Hoài Linh was born on December 18, 1969, in Cam Ranh, Khánh Hòa in a Catholic family with 6 children (3 boys, 3 girls). He is the third child and the eldest son in the family. His parents are from Đại Lộc, Quảng Nam. With the exception of his eldest sister - who were married and remained in Vietnam, his family moved to the United States under the HO status in 1995 - due to the fact that his father previously served in the Republic of Vietnam's Special Forces as a Captain. His mother, Nguyễn Thị Lệ Phương, ran a private maternity home in Cam Ranh.

Hoài Linh lived in Cam Ranh until 1975. He then moved with his family to Dầu Giây. In 1988, his family returned to Cam Ranh. Later, they moved to Ho Chi Minh City in 1992 and migrated to the United States at the end of 1993. During this time, Hoài Linh joined the Ponaga music and dance troupe. He studied at a specialized dance school until 1994, when he returned to the dance group.

In 1991, he participated in a singing contest in Nha Trang. Here, he met Thanh Lộc - an actor from Khánh Hòa's recently disbanded theater department. Thanh Lộc proposed that they formed a comedy duo in the Ponaga group's performances. Hoai Linh happily accepted the invitation. Since then, he officially entered the comedy industry. His first performance took place at Diên Khánh.

Hoài Linh is known for his ability to speak various Vietnamese dialects. Upon moving to Long Khánh, he had the opportunity to talk to people from different regions; this allowed him to learn how to imitate their accents.

After migrating to the United States, his family stayed in Orlando, Florida. Here, he was invited to host a wedding at Saigon restaurant. After that, he was regularly invited to perform at many shows.

Around October 1994, Hoài Linh returned to California. He lived at his 10th uncle's house in Los Angeles. Two weeks later, he had the opportunity to visit Little Saigon, and was taken by Nhật Tùng to Tao Nhân cafe. Here, he performed a comedy of Chuyện tình Karaoke. His acting captured the attention of scriptwriter Ngô Tấn Triển. One week later, Hoài Linh met comedian Vân Sơn and was invited to cooperate with him after comedian Bảo Liêm suddenly stopped collaborating with Vân Sơn.

In October 1994, the duo Vân Sơn - Hoài Linh officially performed together in an event held in Orange County. In 1999, after his return to Vietnam, Hoài Linh established his own business called "Hoài Linh Comedy Music". Later, he started collaborating with Thúy Nga Center and New Smile Company. He and comedian Chí Tài remained friends until the latter passed away on December 9, 2020.

Personal life 

In August 1996, Hoài Linh returned to Vietnam to visit his lover Lê Thanh Hương, whom he had known for a while before leaving Vietnam. Thanh Hương originally worked at a karaoke bar where he often went to sing. The purpose of his trip to Vietnam was to officially marry Lê Thanh Hương and bring her to the United States. However, the couple broke up in 2010.

Hoài Linh has two biological children, Võ Lê Thành Vinh (born in 1990) and a younger daughter (born in 2012). In addition, he also has a lot of adopted children, including Hoài Lâm and Cao Hữu Thiên.

Hoài Linh is the brother of singer Phương Trang and singer Dương Triệu Vũ (whose real name is Võ Nguyễn Tuấn Linh).

Although his parents were Catholics, Hoài Linh has converted to Đạo Mẫu.

Acting work 

Kì Phùng Địch Thủ: as Hoài Linh (performing with Bảo Chung)
10 Năm Nhìn Lại
Ai Câm: as the rich man (Liveshow Chí Tài Comedian 2008)
Áo em chưa mặc một lần
Anh không đòi quà
Anh Sáu Về Quê
Âm dương đôi đường: as the wizard Trần Phiêu Diêu
Bà ơi! Đóng Cửa Lại: as the old husband
Bà Tốn Lấy Le: as the old husband
Bà mẹ vợ (Bán hoa bạo lực): as the mother-in-law
Bác Ba Phi: as Mr. Ba Phi 
Bác sĩ Miệt Vườn: as the doctor
Bầy Vịt Cái: as the pregnant wife
Bốn Mùa
Con sáo sang sông
Cá Cuộc
Cha Yêu 
Chân Dài: as the director's assistant
Chân Quê
Chết chắc rồi 
Chị Dâu Té Giếng
Chia gia tài
Chồng Ghen
Chưa Chắc Đâu Ba: as Tí's father
Chuyện Nàng Hoa hậu
Chuyện Tình Chàng Họa Sĩ
Chuyện Tình Yêu
Chuyện Xứ Người: as the husband
Con ma mặc áo bà ba
Cờ Bạc 
Cổ tích một tình yêu: as Nhi's father
Của Tôi Mà
Cuộc thi Không Chuyên: as Hoài Linh
Cướp cạn
Cười Với Việt Hương 3
Cương Thi Thiếu Nợ 
Đại Nhạc Hội Hài Hoài Linh & Kiều Oanh
Đánh Ghen: as the jealous wife
Đạo diễn kỳ tài 
Dâu đất khách: as Mr. Chín
Đây không phải là Thiên đường 
Đệ nhất thần thấu
Đèo gió hú: as Linh
Đèn thần
Đi chùa cầu duyên: as Thị Mầu
Đi Hỏi Già, Về Nhà Hỏi Trẻ: as the grandpa
Đi Thi Hoa hậu: as the beauty contestant
Du Học: as Mr. Tám
Đường Đại gia: as Đường đại gia
Duyên Nợ
Gã lưu manh và chàng khờ
Gái: as the brother
Gia tộc hà tiện: as the old wife
Gieo quẻ đầu năm
Kẻ gian (performing with Nguyễn Dương)
Khó: as the friend of Mười Khó
Hạc tiên 
Hết lông rồi
Hội thi chim
Lầm
Qua cơn giông bão: as Thuận
Quả Đào Lửa
Ra Giêng anh cưới em: as Sáu Bảnh
Rượu: as Nguyễn Văn Hải
Ru lại câu hò
Tân Ngao Sò ốc Hến: as Hến (Liveshow Bảo Quốc 50 năm vui cười cùng sân khấu)
Tệ hơn vợ thằng Đậu 2
Thám tử Sê Lốc Hom
Thà ăn mày hơn ăn cướp
Thằng Mắm Con Muối: as Mắm
Thiện ác vô song: as the master
Tiều Phu bỏ mẹ: as the woodcutter
Tình cha
Tình con
Tommy Tèo: as Tommy Tèo
Tuyển Lựa ca sĩ
Trạng chết chúa băng hà: as Trạng Quỳnh
Thế giới huyền bí
Trời xanh nhổ lệ
Tư Ếch nằm mơ: as Tư Ếch's child
Trăm nhớ ngàn thương
Sư lịnh tích thành hoàng sống: as Tân
Oan gia ngõ hẹp
Ông Bà Vú
Ông Địa: as the land genie
Ở đợ siêu cấp
Lấy Chồng Đi Con
Lấy Vợ Năm Rồng
Lỗi Ai
Lưu Bình - Dương Lễ: as Lưu Bình
Lý Lửa Gần Rơm
Ly Miêu Hoán Chúa: as Quách Hòe
Lý Phụ Tình
Ma Túy
Mất Trí Nhớ / Kém trí nhớ: as the doctor (performing with Vân Sơn)
Mẹ Yêu
Món Quà Kỳ Diệu: as the husband
Một Bà Hai Ông
Một Duyên Hai Nợ Ba Tình 
Một Ngày Ở Trần Gian
Một Ông Hai Bà: as the husband
Mộng ca sĩ
Nàng Dâu Tương Lai
Nỗi đau đất dày: as the King of Hell
Ngao Sò ốc Hến: as the district official
Ngang trái: as Mạnh Dữ
Nghề Chân Dài
Ngôi nhà hạnh phúc: as Kim Yang Gay
Ngôi Sao Một Ngày
Ngủm vì game online: as Huy's father
Người Hoài Cổ: as the old husband
Người Nhà Quê: as Đặng's father
Người Ở Siêu Cấp
Nhà Bảo Sanh: as the husband
Nợ Duyên
Nơi Bắt Đầu Một Dòng Sông (Thanh Ngân Live Show)
Nhà dột từ nóc: as the father
2!Idol
Viện dưỡng lão
Vợ chồng thằng đậu bây giờ: as Đậu
Vỡ mộng
Vợ thằng đậu: as Đậu's father
Xem mắt nàng dâu: as Nga's mother
Xuất giá tòng phu
Xe ôm: as Linh the driver

References

1969 births
Living people
21st-century Vietnamese male actors
Vietnamese male film actors
Vietnamese male television actors
Former Roman Catholics
Vietnamese emigrants to the United States
People from Quảng Nam province
People from Khánh Hòa Province